Vriesea laxa is a plant species in the genus Vriesea. This species is endemic to Venezuela.

References

laxa
Flora of Venezuela